Prince's Hamburgers is a chain of hamburger restaurants. The business was founded in Dallas in 1929 and expanded into Houston, peaking at 18 locations. The last location in Houston closed in 2018, but the restaurant was revived in 2020.

See also

 List of hamburger restaurants

References

External links
 

1929 establishments in Texas
Hamburger restaurants in the United States
Restaurant chains in the United States
Restaurants in Houston
Restaurants established in 1929